The 1979 European Parliament election in Luxembourg was the election of the delegation from Luxembourg to the European Parliament on 10 June 1979.  It was held on the same day as the legislative elections, which elected members to Luxembourg's Chamber of Deputies.

Results

Footnotes

Luxembourg
European Parliament elections in Luxembourg
1979 in Luxembourg